The Catholic Party was a Belgian political party established in 1869 as the Confessional Catholic Party.

History
In 1852, a Union Constitutionnelle et Conservatrice was founded in Ghent, in Leuven (1854), and in Antwerp and Brussels in 1858, which were active only during elections. On 11 July 1864 the Federation of Catholic Circles and Conservative Associations was created.

The other group which contributed to the party were the Catholic Cercles, of which the eldest had been founded in Bruges. The Malines Congresses in 1863, 1864, and 1867 brought together Ultramontanes or Confessionals and the Liberal-Catholics or Constitutionals. At the Congress of 1867, it was decided to create the League of Catholic Circles, which was founded on 22 October 1868.

The Catholic Party, under the leadership of Charles Woeste, gained an absolute majority in the Belgian Chamber of Representatives in 1884 from the Liberal Party in the wake of the schools dispute. The Catholic Party retained its absolute majority until 1918. In 1921, the party became the Catholic Union, and from 1936 the Catholic Bloc.

At the end of World War II, on 18–19 August 1945 the party was succeeded by the PSC-CVP.

Notable members
 Auguste Beernaert, Nobel Peace Prize in 1909.
 Jules de Burlet
 Paul de Smet de Naeyer
 Jules Vandenpeereboom
 Jules de Trooz
 Gustaaf Sap 
 Frans Schollaert
 Charles de Broqueville
 Gérard Cooreman
 Henri Baels

See also
 Politics of Belgium
 Christene Volkspartij
 Rerum novarum
 Graves de communi re
 Het Volk
 Catholic Church in Belgium

Electoral history

Chamber of Deputies 

 1936 Belgian general election: 61 seats, 27.67% of votes
 1939 Belgian general election: 67 seats, 30.38% of votes

Sources
 
 
 Th. Luykx and M. Platel, Politieke geschiedenis van België, 2 vol., Kluwer, 1985
 E. Witte, J. Craeybeckx en A. Meynen, Politieke geschiedenis van België, Standaard, 1997

Defunct political parties in Belgium
Christian democratic parties in Belgium
Defunct Christian political parties
Political parties established in 1869
1869 establishments in Belgium
1945 disestablishments in Belgium
Political parties disestablished in 1945